The Mindelsee is a Proglacial lake in Radolfzell, Baden-Württemberg Germany.

External links
Lake description 

Lakes of Baden-Württemberg